Akam Maria Rigby (born 1962 in Papua New Guinea) is an Australian international lawn bowler.

Rigby made her Australian debut in 1997 and won a bronze medal in the pairs with Karen Murphy at the 2004 World Outdoor Bowls Championship in Leamington Spa.

She won a bronze medal at the 2003 Asia Pacific Bowls Championships in Brisbane.

In 2021, she won the fours title with Isabella Lawson, Leigh Fortington and Ester Regan at the delayed 2020 Australian National Bowls Championships.

References

Living people
1962 births
Australian female bowls players